Ibragimov, Ibrahimov  (masculine) or Ibragimova, Ibrahimova (feminine) is a common Azerbaijani, Bashkir, Tatar and Central Asian surname.  The spelling reflects the Cyrillic alphabet's version of the name Ibrahim, an Islamic version of the Abraham.  

 Alijan Ibragimov (1954–2021), Uzbek-born Kazakhstani oligarch 
 Alina Ibragimova (born 1985), Russian violinist
 Amir Ibragimov (born 2007), Russian-English footballer
 Aziz Ibrahimov (born 1986), Uzbekistani footballer
 Ibrahim Ibrahimov (born 1958), Azerbaijani businessman
 Ildar Ibragimov (born 1967), Russian-American chess player
 Ildar Abdulovich Ibragimov (born 1932), Russian mathematician
 Magomed Ibragimov (wrestler, born 1983), Uzbekistani wrestler
 Magomed Ibragimov (wrestler, born 1974), Azerbaijani wrestler
 Mubariz Ibrahimov (1988–2010), National Hero of Azerbaijan
 Nail H. Ibragimov (1939–2018), Russian mathematician
 Nadir Ibragimov (1932–1977), Soviet astronomer
 Rinat Ibragimov (ice hockey) (born 1986), Russian professional ice hockey defenceman
 Rinat Ibragimov (judoka) (born 1986), Kazakhstani judoka
 Rinat Ibragimov (musician) (1960–2020), Russian-Tatar classical double bass player
 Shaymardan Ibragimov (1899–1957), Turkmen politician 
 Sultan Ibragimov (born 1975), Russian heavyweight professional boxer
 Timur Ibragimov (born 1975), Uzbek heavyweight professional boxer and cousin of Sultan Ibragimov
 Yıldız İbrahimova (born 1952), Bulgarian singer of Turkish ancestry
 Yosef İbragimov (born 1990), Soviet Jewish Entrepreneur of Computer Science's, crypto-currencies, IT Specialist and private school teacher.

See also 
 Ibragimov (crater), a crater on Mars

Surnames of Uzbekistani origin
Azerbaijani-language surnames
Bashkir-language surnames
Kazakh-language surnames
Kyrgyz-language surnames
Tajik-language surnames
Tatar-language surnames
Turkmen-language surnames
Uzbek-language surnames
Patronymic surnames
Surnames from given names